Hablum (fl. late 3rd millennium BCE) was the 15th Gutian ruler of the Gutian Dynasty of Sumer mentioned on the "Sumerian King List" (SKL). According to the SKL: Hablum was the successor of Ibranum. Puzur-Suen then succeeded Hablum (likewise according to the SKL.)

See also

 History of Sumer
 List of Mesopotamian dynasties

References

Gutian dynasty of Sumer